Clerodendrum cochinchinense is an Asian species of flowering plant in the family Lamiaceae.  This species is found in Cambodia and Vietnam.

References 

cochinchinense
Flora of Indo-China